Rapljevo is a settlement in the southern part of the Municipality of Dobrepolje in Slovenia. The municipality is included in the Central Slovenia Statistical Region. The entire area is part of the historical region of Lower Carniola.

References

External links

Rapljevo on Geopedia

Populated places in the Municipality of Dobrepolje